Srabani Sen (also spelt as Sraboni Sen) is a Bengali Indian exponent of Rabindra Sangeet and Bengali songs. She is a daughter of Sumitra Sen and sister to Indrani Sen. She is a successor to the gharana, which has contributed  to the spread of Tagore's music across the world.

Career
She was schooled at Patha Bhavan school in Kolkata. Later she studied geography at the Gokhale Memorial Girls' College, a women's college affiliated with the  University of Calcutta and earned a postgraduate degree from the same university. She started as a journalist for the Bengali magazine Manorama, before opting for a full-time career in music. Sen's tutelage commenced under her mother's guidance was followed by training at Geetabitan Music Institute.

She has sung on the soundtracks of many films, including Dekha, Baariwali, Swapner Feriwalla, Sanjhbaatir Rupkothara, Ballygunge Court , and Hemanter Pakhi.

In 2014 she started her own music academy, teaching Rabindrasangeet 

She is the daughter of singer Sumitra Sen, and the younger sister of another Rabindra Sangeet exponent Indrani Sen.

Her mother, Sumitra Sen died on 3 January 2023 at the age of 89.

Awards
 In 2000, she was awarded the B.F.J.A award for the best female playback singer for her soulful rendition of Rabindra Sangeet Amala Dhabala Paaley in director Rituparno Ghosh’s film, Utsab.

References

External links
 Srabani Sen imdb
Srabani Sen Official webs
 ite

Indian women classical singers
Singers from Kolkata
Bengali singers
Rabindra Sangeet exponents
Gokhale Memorial Girls' College alumni
University of Calcutta alumni
Living people
Year of birth missing (living people)
20th-century Indian women singers
20th-century Indian singers
21st-century Indian women singers
21st-century Indian singers
Women musicians from West Bengal
20th-century women composers